Bernard Lahire (born 9 November 1963 in Lyon) is a French sociologist and author who serves as a professor of sociology at the ENSL graduate school in Lyon. Lahire is also a member of the Max Weber Center for Advanced Cultural and Social Studies. By the late 2000s, Lahire rose to prominence as one of the country's most eminent living sociologists.

Work 
Lahire's early work involved a critical discussion of Pierre Bourdieu. In his edited voluem Le travail sociologique de Pierre Bourdieu: Dettes et critiques, he contributed with chapters that critiqued the concepts of field and habitus. Lahire's main contention was that these concepts were useful in themselves,  but seemed to run a risk of overgeneralisation. Many sides or spheres of human activity are not like field, even if they are differentiated from other activities. Similarly, Lahire argued that while there were conditions where actors embodied unitary and homogeneous dispositions, this is not always the case. This latter point was elaborated in some considerable detail in his The Plural Actor (2011, French original in 1998). In the book. Lahire raises a number of issues around Bourdieu's formulation of the concept of habitus. Beyond the questions about the unitary nature of habitus, he raises the question of whether social action is so overwhelmingly pre-reflexive and practical as Bourdieu suggests. More generally, with the book, Lahire signalled a focus on the processes whereby dispositions actually become embodied, i.e. socialization. The approach thereby highlights how concrete individuals are socially shaped by a number of factors. In the book, the approach is called psychological sociology, but Lahire now refers to it as a sociology at the level of the individual. It is also sometimes called a dispositionalist-contextualist approach.

The theoretical programme outlined in The Plural Actor was followed up empirically in his Portraits sociologique (2002). The book pioneers his approach of sociological biography, as a concrete way to "do" the sociology at the level of the individual. The book is based on repeated interviews with a limited number of cases. Thus, Lahire aimed to show the concrete social moulding of each individual, unpacking their dispositions and tracing them to socializing experiences. The issue of the dissonance of dispositions was followed through in what was for long his most famous work, La culture des individus—The culture of individuals—from 2006. The book continues from a point made in The Plural Actor, that on the macro scale, it makes sense to describe classes as having or embodying dispositions that set them apart from other classes. However, once the focus is changed to the individual scale, one uncovers a great variety of dispositions, or at least, different cultural practices, which vary with contexts.

Tbe program of a sociology at the level of the individual has been brought further with the study of class inequalities among children in Enfances de classe. The book studies 35 children from different classes, in-depth by combining ethnographic observations with interviews of parents, family friends, teachers and grandparents. This unearths how these children may live in the same society, but effectively in different worlds, as Lahire as said in a summary. Lahire's latest publications represent a radicalization of the psychological sociology inherent in his thinking, with a two volume book dedicated to the sociological interpretation of dreams, the first of volume of which has appeared in English.

Publications 
Lahire has authored a wide range of books, papers and chapters, with only a minority of them appearing in English. The most central English translations are The Plural Actor (1998), The Sociological Interpretation of Dreams (2018) and This is Not Just a Painting (2019).

References 

1963 births
French sociologists
Living people
Chevaliers of the Ordre des Arts et des Lettres